Ó Breisleáin was the surname of an Irish brehon family.

The Ó Breisleáin were natives of Fanad, County Donegal, and a branch of the family later became brehons to the Maguire of County Fermanagh

The surname is now anglicised as Breslin.

 M1495.18 ... O'Breslen, i.e. Owen, the son of Owen, son of Petrus, Chief Brehon to Maguire ..., died.
 M1524.23 O'Breslen (Owen Oge, the son of Owen), Ollav to Maguire in judicature, died.

External links
 http://www.irishtimes.com/ancestor/surname/index.cfm?fuseaction=Go.&UserID=

Surnames
Irish families
Irish Brehon families
Surnames of Irish origin
Irish-language masculine surnames
Families of Irish ancestry